The Three Musketeers (Spanish: Los tres mosqueteros) is a 1942 Mexican comedy film directed by Miguel M. Delgado and starring Cantinflas. It is based on the 1844 novel of the same name by Alexandre Dumas.

Plot
Cantinflas and three friends return a stolen necklace to an actress who invites them to be extras at the CLASA film studios. While on the set, he falls asleep and dreams that he is d'Artagnan, fighting on behalf of Queen Anne.

Cast 
 Cantinflas - Cantinflas / D'Artagnan
 Ángel Garasa - Cardenal Richelieu
 Janet Alcoriza - Mimí / Milady de Winter (as Raquel Rojas)
 Consuelo Frank - Reina / Ana de Austria
 Pituka de Foronda - Constancia / Sra. Bonacieux
 Andrés Soler - Athos
 Julio Villarreal - Rey Luis XIII
 Jorge Reyes - Duque de Buckingham
 Estanislao Schillinsky - Aramis 
 José Elías Moreno - Portos
 Rafael Icardo - Comisario / Sr. de Treville
 Antonio Bravo - Rochefort
 María Calvo - Estefanía, doncella
 Salvador Quiroz - Tabernero
 Alfonso Bedoya - Gorila en cabaret
 José Arratia - Antonio Bonacieux (uncredited)
 Alfonso Carti - Policía (uncredited)
 Roberto Cañedo - Joven en la cola (uncredited)
 María Claveria - Madre de D'Artagnan (uncredited)
 Manuel Dondé - Capitán (uncredited)
 Pedro Elviro - Mesero / Posadero (uncredited)
 Edmundo Espino - Padre de D'Artagnan (uncredited)
 Ana María Hernández - Dama de la corte (uncredited)
 Rubén Márquez - Hombre bailando en cabaret (uncredited)
 Ignacio Peón - Sirviente del rey (uncredited)
 Jorge Rachini - John, sirviente del duque (uncredited)
 Humberto Rodríguez - Sacerdote (uncredited)

Production
Posa Films hired a number of established stars cast to support its contract actor Cantinflas. Miguel M. Delgado, who was already considered "Cantinflas' exclusive director", was assigned the task to direct the lavish and expensive production. Jaime Salvador, whose screenplay for the previous Cantinflas vehicle El gendarme desconocido brought him fame, adapted Dumas' novel for the screen. Ballet Theatre, a renowned dance group of the time, was employed to perform the ballet in the throne room scene.

Release
Los tres mosqueteros was a financial success. It "broke all box-office records" in Mexico and earned 123,000 pesos in its first week and 248,000 in the following three weeks.

Accolades
At the 1946 Cannes Film Festival, Los tres mosqueteros competed for the Grand Prix, which was awarded to another Mexican film, María Candelaria (1943).

References

External links
 
 

1942 films
1942 comedy films
Mexican black-and-white films
Films directed by Miguel M. Delgado
1940s Spanish-language films
Films based on The Three Musketeers
1940s parody films
Cultural depictions of Cardinal Richelieu
Cultural depictions of Louis XIII
1940s buddy comedy films
Mexican comedy films
1940s Mexican films